Glenfield was a railway station to the south west of Paisley, Renfrewshire, Scotland.

History 

The station was originally part of the Paisley and Barrhead District Railway. The line was opened in 1897 and used for freight until the 1960s, but none of its stations - including this one - opened for passenger travel. It was on the west side of the present-day Glenburn Road, opposite Knockside Avenue. It is easy to find the long concrete platform by walking into the trees at the above location. Railway photographer G.H. Robin took three pictures there, two of which during the only time passengers disembarked at Glenfield on an excursion for railway enthusiasts in September 1951. The station was later rented out as a private house while goods trains were still using the line. The photograph shows the excursion train and the tenant's vegetable garden.

References

Notes 

 The GH Robin photographs are the copyright of the Mitchell Library, Glasgow.

Sources 
 
 
 
 
 Dedicated web page
 Location of Glenfield station on navigable OS map

Disused railway stations in Renfrewshire
Unbuilt railway stations in the United Kingdom
Buildings and structures in Paisley, Renfrewshire
Transport in Paisley, Renfrewshire